Argyresthia huguenini is a moth of the family Yponomeutidae. It is found in Switzerland.

It was described from a single specimen collected by Anderegg, probably in Wallis. The species has not been collected since and the identity cannot be stated from the original description alone.

References

Moths described in 1882
Argyresthia
Moths of Europe